The 864th Bombardment Squadron is an inactive United States Air Force unit. Its last assignment was with the 494th Bombardment Wing at Sheppard Air Force Base, Texas, where it flew Boeing B-52 Stratofortresses under Strategic Air Command.  It was inactivated on 2 April 1966.

The squadron was first activated in late 1943 for service during World War II.  After training in the United States, it deployed to the Pacific, where it participated in the strategic bombing campaign against Japan.  It returned to the United States and was inactivated in 1946.  In 1958, it was redesignated the 864th Strategic Missile Squadron and conducted training on the SM-78 Jupiter missile until again inactivating in 1960.  In 1963, it returned to its original designation and was activated at Sheppard.

History

World War II

Organization and training in the United States
The 864th Bombardment Squadron was first activated at Wendover Field, Utah on 1 December 1943 as one of the original squadrons of the 494th Bombardment Group, the last heavy bomber group formed by the Army Air Forces. It trained with Consolidated B-24 Liberators at Wendover and at Mountain Home Army Air Field, Idaho.  In January and February 1944, a cadre of the squadron trained under simulated combat conditions at Orlando Army Air Base, Florida with the Army Air Forces Tactical Center, with aircrews filling out the squadron in March.  The air echelon began to receive new B-24Js in May and the began departing for Hawaii on 28 May. The ground echelon began its move to Hawaii on 1 June 1944.

Combat in the Pacific

The squadron remained at Barking Sands Army Air Field for additional training and modifications to its planes to meet theater standards until late September 1944, when it deployed to Angaur Airstrip in the Palau Islands. The squadron ground echelon was initially involved with the construction of the base on Angaur. Although some unit aircrews flew combat missions with the 30th Bombardment Group from Saipan, the air echelon only began to arrive on Angaur on 24 October 1944, after the Seabees and Army engineers had prepared the airstrip for heavy bomber operations. The squadron finally conducted its first mission on 3 November, when it attacked Japanese airfields on Yap and Koror. It conducted attacks on Japanese military that had been bypassed as American forces had advanced in the Central Pacific.  It also attacked the Philippines, hitting gun emplacements, bivouacs, and storage depots on Corregidor and Caballo Islands at the entrance to Manila Bay.  It also attacked radio communications installations and power plants at Japanese bases in the Philippines; and attacked airfields, including Clark Field on Luzon. Early in 1945, the 864th struck ammunition and supply dumps in the Davao Gulf and Illana Bay areas of Mindanao and airfields on the island.

The squadron moved to Okinawa in June 1945. From its base at Yontan Airfield it engaged primarily in attacks against enemy airfields on Kyūshū and around the Inland Sea of Japan until V-J Day. It also struck airfields in China and Korea.  The unit also participated in incendiary raids and dropped propaganda leaflets over urban areas of Kyūshū.  After the war's end, the unit transporting personnel and supplies from Manila to Tokyo.  In December, the squadron returned to the United States, where it was inactivated at the Vancouver Barracks Port of Embarkation on 6 January 1946.

Jupiter missile training

The squadron was redesignated the 864th Strategic Missile Squadron and activated at Redstone Arsenal, Alabama in January 1958.  This was the first of three SM-78 Jupiter missile squadrons Strategic Air Command (SAC) would activate at the Redstone Arsenal. Because the squadron's mission would be to conduct training of Italian Air Force personnel on the Jupiter missile, it was stationed at the arsenal, which was the location of the Army Ballistic Missile Agency, which had developed the Jupiter, even though the 864th's parent organization, the 1st Missile Division was located thousands of miles away at Vandenberg Air Force Base, California.  The first Jupiter for training was delivered in August. Although the Air Force had been given responsibility for the Jupiter by the Department of Defense. it became clear that it would not operate the missile, and in April 1959, the squadron became the 864th Technical Training Squadron.  That same month a plan was developed to establish a Jupiter unit in the Italian Air Force, which was to become the 36th Strategic Interdiction Air Brigade. The 864th trained Italian Air Force personnel in the operation and launching of the Jupiter until it was inactivated on 1 June 1960 as the Italians assumed responsibility for their own missiles.

Strategic Air Command bomber operations
As part of its program to disperse its Boeing B-52 Stratofortress bombers over a larger number of bases, thus making it more difficult for the Soviet Union to knock out the entire fleet with a surprise first strike, SAC had established the 4245th Strategic Wing at Sheppard Air Force Base, Texas. In February 1963, the 494th Bombardment Wing assumed the aircraft, personnel and equipment of the discontinued 4245th wing. The 4245th was a Major Command controlled (MAJCON) wing, which could not carry a permanent history or lineage, and SAC wanted to replace it with a permanent unit.  As part of this reorganization the 864th returned to its original designation as a bombardment squadron and assumed the mission, personnel and equipment of the 717th Bombardment Squadron, which was simultaneously inactivated.

One half of the squadron's aircraft were maintained on fifteen minute alert, fully fueled and ready for combat to reduce vulnerability to a Soviet missile strike. The squadron also trained in strategic bomber operations. In December 1965, a few months after the first B-52Bs started leaving the operational inventory, Robert S. McNamara, Secretary of Defense, directed a phaseout program that would further reduce SAC's bomber force. This program called for the retirement of all B-52Cs, and of several subsequent B-52 models. In this drawdown, the squadron was inactivated on 2 April 1966.

Lineage
 Constituted as the 864th Bombardment Squadron, Heavy on 14 September 1943
 Activated on 1 December 1943
 Inactivated on 6 January 1946
 Redesignated 864th Strategic Missile Squadron (IRBM-Jupiter) on 7 January 1958
 Activated on 15 January 1958
 Redesignated 864th Technical Training Squadron on 15 April 1959
 Discontinued on 1 June 1960
 Redesignated 864th Bombardment Squadron, Heavy on 15 November 1962
 Organized on 1 February 1963
 Inactivated on 2 April 1966

Assignments
 494th Bombardment Group, 1 December 1943 – 4 January 1946
 1st Missile Division, 15 January 1958
 704th Strategic Missile Wing, 23 February 1958 (attached to 1st Missile Division after 1 November 1958)
 1st Missile Division, 1 July 1959
 Department of the Air Force, 1 June 1960 (not organized)
 Strategic Air Command, 15 November 1962 (not organized)
 494th Bombardment Wing, 1 February 1963 – 2 April 1966

Stations
 Wendover Field, Utah, 1 December 1943
 Mountain Home Army Air Field, Idaho, 14 April 1944 – 1 June 1944
 Barking Sands Army Air Field, Hawaii, 15 June 1944
 Angaur Airstrip, Angaur, Palau Islands, 30 September 1944
 Yontan Airfield, Okinawa, 24 June 1945 – 13 December 1945
 Vancouver Barracks, Washington, 3–6 January 1946
 Redstone Arsenal. Alabama, 15 January 1958 – 1 June 1960
 Sheppard Air Force Base, Texas, 1 February 1963 – 1 April 1966

Aircraft
 Consolidated B-24 Liberator, 1944–1945
 Boeing B-52 Stratofortress, 1963–1966

Awards and campaigns

See also

 B-24 Liberator units of the United States Army Air Forces
 List of B-52 Units of the United States Air Force
 List of United States Air Force missile squadrons

References

Notes
 Explanatory notes

 Citations

Bibliography

 
 
 
 
 
 
 
 

Military units and formations established in 1943
Strategic bombing squadrons of the United States Army Air Forces
Bombardment squadrons of the United States Air Force